Esgyrn Bottom is a Site of Special Scientific Interest (or SSSI) in Pembrokeshire, South Wales. It has been designated as a Site of Special Scientific Interest since January 1957 in an attempt to protect its fragile biological and geological elements.

Type
This SSSI has been notified as being of both geological and biological importance.

It has three special features.
  Raised bog
  Rare mosses and liverworts including: Sphagnum magellanicum and Sphagnum fuscum, and the liverworts Pallavicinia lyelii (veilwort) and Cephaloziella elachista
  Glacial meltwater channel and associated deposits

See also
List of Sites of Special Scientific Interest in Pembrokeshire

References

External links
Natural Resources Wales website

Sites of Special Scientific Interest in Pembrokeshire